Appula argenteoapicalis is a species of beetle in the family Cerambycidae. It was described by Ernst Fuchs in 1961.

References

Elaphidiini
Beetles described in 1961